Gabriel Oscar Giron Villarreal (born 27 February 1988) is a Mexican professional basketball player for Libertadores de Querétaro of the Mexican Liga Nacional de Baloncesto Profesional (LNBP). He was a part of the 2017 Mexican championship winning Fuerza Regia team, and was a member of the Mexico's national basketball team at the 2016 FIBA World Olympic Qualifying Tournament – Turin, Italy.

References

External links
Profile at 2016 FIBA OQT
Latinbasket.com profile
Real GM profile

Videos
Gabriel Giron Jr. #24 Highlights LNBP 13-14 Youtube.com video

1988 births
Living people
Basketball players from Nuevo León
Capitanes de Ciudad de México players
Competitors at the 2018 Central American and Caribbean Games
Dorados de Chihuahua (LNBP) players
Frayles de Guasave players
Fuerza Regia de Monterrey players
Mexican men's basketball players
Panteras de Aguascalientes players
Point guards
Sportspeople from Monterrey